United States women's junior national goalball team is the women's junior national team of the United States. It takes part in international goalball competitions.

World Championships 
The 2005 Junior World Championships were held in Colorado Springs, Colorado.  The team was one of three teams participating, and they finished first overall.

IBSA World Youth and Student Games 
The 2007 IBSA (International Blind Sports Federation) World Youth and Student Games were held in the United States.  The team was one of four teams participating, with the United States finishing first, Germany second, Russia third and Canada fourth.

Competitive history 
The table below contains individual game results for the team in international matches and competitions.

References

National junior women's goalball teams
United States at the Paralympics
Goalball in the United States
Goalball